Walter Robert McDonald (born July 18, 1934, died January 22, 2022, in Lubbock, Texas) was an American poet and former professor. He served as Poet Laureate of Texas in 2001. In May 2002, he retired from Texas Tech University as "Paul Whitfield Horn Professor of English" and "Poet in Residence".

Career
After graduating from Texas Technological College and service in the United States Air Force in Vietnam, McDonald received a PhD from the University of Iowa.

McDonald's 23 books of poetry—published by Harper & Row (now HarperCollins) and university presses such as Ohio State; Notre Dame; Massachusetts; Pittsburgh; Texas Christian; Texas Tech—include Faith Is A Radical Master, 'Night Landing,' and A Thousand Miles of Stars. Before joining the faculty at Texas Tech University, he was a pilot in the Air Force and also taught at the Air Force Academy.

Some of his experiences as a pilot are reflected in his verses.

References

External links
 Author papers at Southwest Collection/Special Collections Library, Texas Tech University

1934 births
Living people
Abilene Christian University alumni
American members of the Churches of Christ
American male poets
People from Lubbock, Texas
Poets Laureate of Texas
Texas Tech University faculty
United States Air Force officers
University of Iowa alumni
Military personnel from Texas